Dishoom is a small Bombay (Mumbai)-inspired restaurant group with locations throughout the UK. 

Evoking the Irani cafés which were popular across Bombay in the 1960s, Dishoom was founded in 2010 by co-founders Shamil and Kavi Thakrar as well as Amar and Adarsh Radia (who both left the business in 2017). The first Dishoom café opened in Covent Garden in 2010. As of 2022, there are eight Dishoom restaurants open around the United Kingdom, with locations in London, Edinburgh, Manchester and Birmingham.

In 2020 Dishoom expanded their offering, introducing the Dishoom online store to sit alongside their restaurants. Selling meal kits, preserves, signature cocktails and gifts, the Dishoom Store allows customers to order popular dishes from Dishoom restaurants to cook at home.

Menu
The menu includes breakfast naan breads.

Awards 
 Ranked #4, Times Best Places to Work For in the UK, 2021
 Ranked #12, Best Places to Work for in the UK, 2021
 Best Restaurant Scotland, British Curry Awards, 2021
 Employer of the year, R200 Restaurant Awards 2021 
 Ranked #19, Sunday Times Top 100 Companies to work for, 2017
Best Overall Operator – under 20 sites – Restaurant Magazine R200, 2017
Most Admired Brand – CGA, Peach Heroes and Icon Awards, 2018
Restaurateur of the Year (Group) – The Catey's, 2018
Diversity in Business – Edinburgh Business Award, 2018
 Best Breakfast Destination – The Scottish Food Awards, 2017
 Best Small Group – Good Food Guide UK, 2017
Best Restaurant in the UK – Yelp! reviewers 2015 & 2016
 Best Casual Dining, British Curry Awards – winner, 2014 & 2016

References

External links 
 

Anglo-Indian cuisine
Asian restaurants in London
Indian restaurants in the United Kingdom
Restaurants established in 2010